Fuat Çapa (born 15 August 1968) is a Turkish football manager.

Career
Çapa coached in Belgium before moving on to Turkey. His career in Belgium spanned four years as he held positions with K.V. Turnhout, K. Patro Maasmechelen, K. Beringen-Heusden-Zolder, Verbroedering Geel, and most recently VW Hamme. He is the first Turkish coach to receive a UEFA Pro Licence. On 29 May 2008 he was named the new head coach of Dutch club MVV Maastricht as the successor of Robert Maaskant. He temporarily managed Gençlerbirliği in the 2007–2008 season, and returned there in 2011. At the end of the 2012–2013 season, Gençlerbirliği S.K. chose not to retain his services and became the new head coach of newly promoted Kayseri Erciyesspor. In the second half of the league, Çapa left Erciyesspor and joined Antalyaspor for a few months. The following year, he joined Wil, but again did not last long there, as he was succeeded by Kevin Cooper.

References

External links
 

1968 births
Living people
People from Emirdağ
Turkish football managers
Belgian football managers
Turkish emigrants to Belgium
K. Patro Eisden Maasmechelen managers
MVV Maastricht managers
Gençlerbirliği S.K. managers
Belgian people of Turkish descent
Süper Lig managers
K.V. Turnhout managers